From No Time to Rag Time is an album by European jazz group the Vienna Art Orchestra featuring variations on compositions by Anthony Braxton, Ornette Coleman, Scott Joplin, Hans Koller, Charles Mingus, Fritz Pauer, Bud Powell and Roswell Rudd which was first released in 1983 on the Hat ART label.

Reception

The Allmusic review stated: "Powerful atonal improvisors Lauren Newton, Mathies Ruegg leading and conducting the 13-piece group. The best soloists are Herbert Joos on flugelhorn, Harry Sokal on sax/flute, and Wolfgang Pusching on sax. ... The best cuts are 'Variations About Silence (For Ornette),' and 'Jelly Roll, but Mingus Rolls Better'".

Track listing
 "Variations about N 508-10 (4G)" (Anthony Braxton/Mathias Rüegg) − 10:43
 "Variations about Keep Your Heart Right" (Roswell Rudd/Mathias Rüegg) − 11:19
 "Variations About Silence" (Ornette Coleman/Mathias Rüegg) − 14:57
 "Un Poco Loco" (Bud Powell) − 6:47
 "Variations about A Liberate Proposal" (Fritz Pauer/Mathias Rüegg) − 5:49
 "Variations about Soma" (Hans Koller/Mathias Rüegg) − 10:43
 "Jelly Roll, But Mingus Rolls Better" (Charles Mingus/Mathias Rüegg) − 10:39
 "Variations about The Cascades" (Scott Joplin/Mathias Rüegg) − 4:03

Personnel
Mathias Rüegg − arranger, conductor 
Karl Fian − trumpet
Herbert Joos − flugelhorn, alphorn, double trumpet
Christian Radovan − trombone
Billy Fuchs − tuba
Wolfgang Puschnig − soprano saxophone, alto saxophone, bass clarinet, flute
Harry Sokal − soprano saxophone, tenor saxophone, flute
Roman Schwaller − tenor saxophone, clarinet
Uli Scherer − piano, melodica
Woody Schabata - marimba, vibraphone
Jürgen Wuchner − bass
Wolfgang Reisinger, Janusz Stefanski - drums, percussion
Lauren Newton - voice

References

1983 live albums
Hathut Records live albums
Vienna Art Orchestra live albums